Slawomir Paul Freier (Polish: Sławomir Paweł Freier; born 26 July 1979) is a German football coach and former player who was usually employed as a midfielder. He is currently the assistant manager of VfL Bochum U19.

Biography

Childhood and youth 
Freier was born in 1979 in the Upper Silesian city of Bytom (German: Beuthen). At the age of 5, he joined the club ŁTS Łabędy in Gliwice, Poland. At age 11, Freier emigrated with his parents from Upper Silesia to Germany, where the family settled in Arnsberg-Holzen in North Rhine-Westphalia. Newly arrived there, he joined SV Holzen and three years later moved to BSV Menden. In his youth, Freier received an offer from Borussia Dortmund, but his father refused a move to Dortmund. In 1996, Freier joined the youth team of VfL Bochum.

First spell at Bochum 
In 1998, Freier was part of Bochum's second team, and on 5 November 1999, he made his professional debut for the first team in a 2–0 win against SV Waldhof Mannheim on matchday eleven of the 1999–2000 2. Bundesliga campaign. In the 89th minute, he replaced Delron Buckley. With Bochum, Freier celebrated promotion to the Bundesliga. On 12 August 2000, he made his debut in the Bundesliga in a 1–0 win on first matchday against 1. FC Kaiserslautern.  On 28 April 2001, 31st match day, Freier scored his first goal in the Bundesliga in the 1–1 draw in the derby against FC Schalke 04. At the end of the season, he had made 22 appearances and scored one goal and VfL Bochum was relegated from the Bundesliga. In the 2001–02 season, Freier made 30 appearances scoring seven goals and was promoted again with the VfL Bochum to the Bundesliga. In the next season, Bochum reached the ninth place with Freier making 32 appearances and scoring seven goals. In the 2003–04 season, he played in 27 games and scored one goal. This season, VfL Bochum placed in the final standings in front of their local rivals from Gelsenkirchen, FC Schalke and Borussia Dortmund (Schalke being a district of Gelsenkirchen).

Spell at Bayer Leverkusen 
In four seasons at Bayer Leverkusen between 2004 and 2008, Freier amassed 17 goals in 112 league matches.

Return to VfL Bochum and retirement 
Freier returned to VfL Bochum at the end of the 2007–08 season, signing a five-year contract.

Post-retirement
Six months after retiring as a player, Freier was hired as assistant coach for the U16 team of VfL Bochum.

On 8 June 2015, it was confirmed that Freier was the new assistant manager of the U19 team of Bochum.

International
Freier was a member of the German national team, winning 19 caps. He was initially named in Germany's UEFA Euro 2004 squad but had to withdraw through injury. He was called up as a backup squad member for the 2006 World Cup. His only goal for Germany came in a 4–1 win over Canada in June 2003.

Statistics

1 2010–11 includes the 2. Bundesliga/Bundesliga promotion/relegation playoffs.

References

External links
 
 
 
 Leverkusen who's who

1979 births
Living people
German footballers
Germany international footballers
Germany under-21 international footballers
VfL Bochum players
VfL Bochum II players
Bayer 04 Leverkusen players
People from Bytom
Bundesliga players
2. Bundesliga players
Association football wingers
German people of Polish descent
Polish emigrants to Germany
Naturalized citizens of Germany